Had Enough may refer to:

 "Had Enough" (Don Toliver song), 2019
 "Had Enough" (The Enemy song), from the 2007 album We'll Live and Die in These Towns
 "Had Enough" (Papa Roach song), from the 2009 album Metamorphosis
 "Had Enough" (The Who song), from the 1978 album Who Are You
 "Had Enough", a 2010 song by Lifehouse featuring Chris Daughtry from the album Smoke & Mirrors

See also
 I've Had Enough (disambiguation)